Environment is a 1922 American silent crime film directed by Irving Cummings and starring Milton Sills, Alice Lake and Gertrude Claire.

Synopsis
As part of her rehabilitation, a reformed female crook is sent to work for a man who was robbed by her partners. Over time she falls in love with him but the return of her formal criminal associates drags her back to her old life.

Cast
 Milton Sills as Steve MacLaren
 Alice Lake as Sally 'Chicago Sal' Dolan
 Ben Hewlett as Willie Boy Toval
 Gertrude Claire as Grandma MacLaren
 Richard Headrick as Jimmie
 Ralph Lewis as 	Diamond Jim Favre

References

Bibliography
 Connelly, Robert B. The Silents: Silent Feature Films, 1910-36, Volume 40, Issue 2. December Press, 1998.
 Munden, Kenneth White. The American Film Institute Catalog of Motion Pictures Produced in the United States, Part 1. University of California Press, 1997.

External links
 

1922 films
1922 crime films
American silent feature films
American crime films
Films directed by Irving Cummings
American black-and-white films
1920s American films